Ludovico Girardello (born 5 December 2000 in Vittorio Veneto) is an Italian actor best known for his role of Michele Silenzi in The Invisible Boy movie series.

References

External links
 

2000 births
Living people
Italian male film actors
21st-century Italian male actors
Italian male child actors
People from Vittorio Veneto